Ghana elects on national level a head of state, the president, and a legislature. The president is elected for a four-year term by the people. The Parliament of Ghana has 275 members, elected for a four-year term in single-seat constituencies. 
The presidential election is won by having more than 50% of valid votes cast, whilst the parliamentary elections is won by simple majority, and, as is predicted by Duverger's law, the voting system has encouraged Ghanaian politics into a two-party system, creating extreme difficulty for anybody attempting to achieve electoral success under any banner other than those of the two dominant parties. Elections have been held every four years since 1992.  Presidential and parliamentary elections are held alongside each other, generally on 7 December every four years.

Scholars review of elections

Presidential

Parliamentary

See also
 Electoral calendar
 Electoral system
 Electoral Commission of Ghana
 List of general elections in Ghana

Ethnic voting in Ghana 
Ethnic voting is the idea that people utilize candidates' ethnic identity to decide who can be best trusted to follow through with their promises for goods to their coethnic constituents as payment for their vote. This form of vote buying in which one's vote is paid for through a targeted public good is known as clientelism and is especially popular in sub-Saharan African countries. Kanchan Chandra, one of the leading academics in Ethnic Politics, claims that there are several causes for this phenomenon in Africa. First, the individual has an incentive to seek out public goods for their vote because of one's perception that their vote individually will not lead to altering the election. Through this logic, Chandra displays that there is an incentive for people to organize for casting their vote within this context because, even if the one does not benefit from this vote individually, their collective vote may allow this group some access to favoritism from the candidate if they win thus establishing greater value in their collective votes. Furthermore, the candidate has an incentive to provide benefits to groups for their vote because an individual method of distributing jobs and services may create conflict in which providing a good to one voter may deprive another voter of that same good; therefore, a group method of distribution both allows for less conflict and greater insurance for the voter that the candidate will follow through on their end. To gain access to a salient group that desires jobs and services to target as well as establish credibility among that group, candidates often use their own ethnic identity, or coethnics, as a targeted community. Furthermore, the history of colonialism within most African countries means that ethnic identity tends to be more salient and available for candidates' access through appeals to shared ethnicity.

Ethnic Voting and Composition of Region 
Ethnic favoritism in Ghana has been shown to be a method of gaining votes; however, the effectiveness among voters may vary between diverse and homogeneous communities. While not conducted in Ghana, research in sub-Saharan Africa has found that community investments are significantly more likely to occur in which there are more homogenous communities. This displays how communities largely composed of one ethnicity may be benefiting from ethnic voting at the local level. The allocation of public goods to a homogeneous area is claimed to be a direct result of ethnic favoritism. While examining how people in Ghana vote within homogenous, rural communities versus more diverse communities, another study finds support for this theory in that more homogenous communities are more likely to vote for the party that supports their ethnicity. Furthermore, when there are ethnic minorities within a homogenous and rural community, they are more likely to vote for the opposition party or their non-coethnic. The researcher explains this as voting based on the mutual benefit of targeted public goods. In this example, minorities within this homogeneous and rural community would equally benefit from the public goods placed in their area as the majority. Therefore, the minority is more likely to advocate for this candidate even though they do not specifically favor their ethnic identity. In contrast, other researchers argue that minority groups within these communities vote along non-coethnic lines due to voter intimidation. This is supported by observing how voting among these minorities for non-coethnic candidates does not vary between locations that have public goods and those that do not. Another researcher's findings display how the choice of voting by ethnicity may depend also on public versus private goods. Similarly, another researcher finds that homogenous communities are more likely to vote for the candidate that supports their ethnic identity and minorities within those ethnically homogenous communities are more likely to support the opposition party because they are more likely to obtain access to public goods that the homogenous community receives. Additionally, this study also finds that diverse and urban communities often have less ethnic voting when considering public goods. However, this study also finds that ethnic minorities are more likely to have an expectation that they will receive private goods if they are within poor communities, even if they are the ethnic minority of a community.

Additionally, research shows the ethnic voting at the local level in Ghana may have greater implications for national elections. For example, ethnic voting towards the presidency may depend on the amount of clientelism taking place for local elections. This theory, "reverse coattails", supports the idea that clientelism surrounding ethnicity at the local level incentivizes individuals to participate at the party level thus aligning them with the party of a presidential candidate that their local official supports. Therefore, the support that local officials gain through co-ethnic clientelism also creates support for the executive candidate in the same party.

Implications of Ethnic Voting 
Research has also displayed that the ethnic association created within politics may cause greater conflict and implicit biases between ethnic groups. Because candidates have mobilized ethnic groups through clientelist practices, ethnic groups create stronger ties to their ethnicity around times of competitive elections. By examining how people define themselves (by ethnicity, language, economic status, etc.), one cross-national study found data that when elections are closer and more competitive, it is more likely that people will identify with the ethnic category associated with their ethnicity. This supports the idea that ethnic identity is largely bound to politics because it has historically been used as a political tool. In Ghana, this theory has been supported by studying the microeconomic interactions between people of different ethnic groups. After collecting data on the price of taxis in a field experiment at various time points around an election, the study found that non-coethnics were charged more, on average, than non-ethnics. However, at election time, non-coethnics that were affiliated with an opposing political party (non-copartisans) were charged even more, while non-coethnics affiliated with the same party (copartisans) were charged less. Thus, when ethnic groups are nested in political parties, it can reduce discrimination between ethnic groups within a party but exacerbate discrimination between ethnic groups affiliated with opposing parties.

Alternative Opinions 
Although these studies argue that ethnic voting is prevalent in Ghana due to the lack of political information available, other research indicates Ghanaian people do not vote primarily due to ethnicity. This research emphasizes that, although there is less information available to Ghanaian people, they are still more likely to choose a candidate based on past performance and policy plans. Therefore, there are articles indicating that the prevalence of clientelism and ethnic voting only account for a small portion of the population. Other research indicates that while clientelism is a signal of viability to voters in Ghana, it is not alone capable of "buying" one's vote. Therefore, candidates are still reliant on the information they are able to obtain concerning past political performance to judge candidates' performances. This election organization in which gifts are necessary to be seen as a viable candidate is seen as manufactured by years of clientelist practices. As candidates from different parties competed to buy votes, this transaction became standard as a way of interacting with voters.

References

External links
Adam Carr's Election Archive
African Elections Database
Ghana Elections 2008